Euryope bipartita is a species of leaf beetle of the Democratic Republic of the Congo, described by Martin Jacoby in 1897.

References 

Eumolpinae
Beetles of the Democratic Republic of the Congo
Taxa named by Martin Jacoby
Beetles described in 1897
Endemic fauna of the Democratic Republic of the Congo